Tadesse or Tadese is a name of Ethiopian origin which may refer to:

Athletes
Tadese Tola (born 1987), winner of the 2008 New York City Half Marathon
Feyse Tadese (born 1988), Ethiopian half marathon specialist
Kidane Tadese (born 1987), 2008 Olympian and brother of Zersenay Tadese
Meba Tadesse (born 1986), team silver medallist in the 2003 World Cross Country Championships
Mekdes Bekele Tadese (born 1987), 2007 All-Africa Games silver medallist in steeplechase
Mestawat Tadesse (born 1985), female athlete specialising in 1500 metres
Zersenay Tadese (born 1982), four-time World Half Marathon champion and Olympic bronze medallist

Others
Tadesse Alemu (?-2007), traditional Ethiopian singer
Tadesse Mamechae (Tadesse Mamecha Gebre-Tsadik, born 1941), Ethiopian sculptor
Sinedu Tadesse (1974–1995), committed murder-suicide on a Harvard University campus
Abraham Tadesse, Ethiopian American.  Founder and CEO of WAN Industries Pvt LTD.
Tadesse Birru (1921–1975), Ethiopian army officer and revolutionary

Amharic-language names